Phaeapate albula is a species of beetle in the family Cerambycidae. It was described by Pascoe in 1865. It is found in Australia.

References

Desmiphorini
Beetles described in 1865